Eleonora Verbeke (1713–1786) was a nun and apothecary at the Sint-Janshospitaal in Bruges, West Flanders, Belgium. She was a co-author of the Winckelbouck, in which, from 1751, she described all her medical recipes. Everyday recipes were also noted. She wrote in Dutch but also made use of the Bruges dialect.

On 13 April 2020, the square in Sint-Janshospitaal was named after her.

References

History of Bruges
1713 births
1786 deaths